Qualification for the 2005 Little League World Series took place in eight United States regions and eight international regions from June through August 2005.

United States

Great Lakes
The tournament took place in Indianapolis, Indiana from August 3–10.

Mid-Atlantic
The tournament took place in Bristol, Connecticut from August 6–15.

Midwest
The tournament took place in Indianapolis, Indiana from August 5–12.

New England
The tournament took place in Bristol, Connecticut from August 6–14.

Northwest
The tournament took place in San Bernardino, California on August 6–15.

Southeast
The tournament took place in St. Petersburg, Florida from August 6–12.

Southwest
The tournament took place in Waco, Texas from August 7–13.

West
The tournament took place in San Bernardino, California from August 6–14.

International

Asia
The tournament took place in Fukuoka, Japan from July 23–29.

Canada
The tournament took place in Timmins, Ontario from August 6–13.

Caribbean
The tournament took place in Saint Croix, U.S. Virgin Islands from July 24–30.

Europe, Middle East & Africa
The tournament took place in Kutno, Poland from August 1–8.

Latin America
The tournament took place in Maracaibo, Venezuela from July 10–16.

Mexico
The tournament took place in Reynosa, Tamaulipas from July 23 to August 1.

Phase 1

Phase 2

Championship round

Pacific
The tournament took place in Fukuoka, Japan from July 23–29.

Transatlantic
The tournament took place in Vilseck, Germany from August 1–8.

References 

2005 Little League World Series